Comostolopsis is a genus of moths in the family Geometridae. It was described by Warren in 1902.

Species
 Comostolopsis apicata (Warren, 1898)
 Comostolopsis apodosima Prout, 1931
 Comostolopsis capensis (Warren, 1899)
 Comostolopsis coerulea Warren, 1902
 Comostolopsis convalescens Herbulot, 1981
 Comostolopsis fluorita Prout, 1927
 Comostolopsis germana Prout, 1916
 Comostolopsis glos D. S. Fletcher, 1978
 Comostolopsis intensa Prout, 1915
 Comostolopsis leuconeura Prout, 1930
 Comostolopsis marginata
 Comostolopsis regina
 Comostolopsis rubristicta (Warren, 1899)
 Comostolopsis rufocellata (Mabille, 1900)
 Comostolopsis rufostellata (Mabille, 1900)
 Comostolopsis simplex Warren, 1902
 Comostolopsis sladeni Prout, 1915
 Comostolopsis stillata (Felder & Rogenhofer, 1875)
 Comostolopsis subsimplex Prout, 1913
 Comostolopsis tmematica Prout, 1934
 Comostolopsis viridellaria (Mabille, 1898)

References
Warren (1902). "New African Drepanulidae, Thyrididae, Epiplemidae, and Geometridae in the Tring Museum". Novitates Zoologicae. 9:487–536.
 
 
 Zipcodezoo.com

Geometrinae